The 2018 ISSF World Cup is the annual edition of the ISSF World Cup in the Olympic shooting events, governed by the International Shooting Sport Federation.

Considering 2020 Olympic Games, the ISSF has made many changes in the categories and competition. For the first time, mixed team medal events in 10m Air Pistol, 10m Air Rifle and Trap categories have been introduced officially while 50m Rifle Prone Men, 50m Pistol Men and Double Trap Men, which were earlier part of World Cup Series and Olympic Games has been discontinued from this World Cup series. Which makes the total number of medals in both Men's and Women's section equal.

Men's results

Rifle Events

Pistol Events

Shotgun Events

Women's Results

Rifle Events

Pistol Events

Shotgun Events

Mixed Team Results

Overall Medal Tally* 

 *After ISSF World Cup 2018, Tucson, USA

References 

ISSF World Cup
ISSF World Cup